Daniel Cisneros González (born 27 January 1992) is a Mexican professional footballer who plays as a midfielder for Liga de Expansión MX club Sonora.

References

External links
 

1992 births
Living people
Tecos F.C.
Atlas F.C. footballers
Mineros de Zacatecas players
Correcaminos UAT footballers
Alebrijes de Oaxaca players
Liga MX players
Ascenso MX players
Liga Premier de México players
Tercera División de México players
Footballers from Sinaloa
Sportspeople from Mazatlán
Association football midfielders
Mexican footballers